Hypopyra burmanica is a moth of the family Erebidae first described by George Hampson in 1913. It is found in Myanmar.

References

Moths described in 1913
Hypopyra